Homalura is a genus of frit flies in the family Chloropidae. There are about six described species in Homalura.

Species
These six species belong to the genus Homalura:
 Homalura atra Nartshuk, 1968 c g
 Homalura disciventris (Enderlein, 1911) c g
 Homalura dumonti Seguy, 1934 c g
 Homalura flava Brulle, 1833 g
 Homalura sarudnyi Becker, 1910 c g
 Homalura tarsata Meigen, 1826 c g
Data sources: i = ITIS, c = Catalogue of Life, g = GBIF, b = Bugguide.net

References

Further reading

External links

 

Chloropinae
Chloropidae genera